Mineral tests are several methods which can help identify the mineral type. This is used widely in mineralogy, hydrocarbon exploration and general mapping. There are over 4000 types of minerals known with each one with different sub-classes. Elements make minerals and minerals make rocks so actually testing minerals in the lab and in the field is essential to understand the history of the rock which aids data, zonation, metamorphic history, processes involved and other minerals.

The following tests are used on specimen and thin sections through polarizing microscope.

Color
Color of the mineral. This is not mineral specific. For example quartz can be almost any color, shape and within many rock types.

Streak

Color of the mineral's powder. This can be found by rubbing the mineral onto a concrete. This is more accurate but not always mineral specific.

Lustre

This is the way light reflects from the mineral's surface. A mineral can be metallic (shiny) or non-metallic (not shiny).

Transparency

The way light travels through minerals. The mineral can be transparent (clear), translucent (cloudy) or opaque (none).

Specific gravity

Ratio between the weight of the mineral relative to an equal volume of water.

Mineral habitat

The shape of the crystal and habitat.

Magnetism

Magnetic or nonmagnetic. Can be tested by using a magnet or a compass. This does not apply to all ion minerals (for example, pyrite).

Cleavage

Number, behaviour, size and way cracks fracture in the mineral.

UV fluorescence

Many minerals glow when put under a UV light.

Radioactivity

Is the mineral radioactive or non-radioactive? This is measured by a Geiger counter.

Taste
This is not recommended. Is the mineral salty, bitter or does it have no taste?

Bite Test
This is not recommended. This involves biting a mineral to see if its generally soft or hard. This was used in early gold exploration to tell the difference between pyrite (fools gold, hard) and gold (soft).

Hardness

The Mohs Hardness Scale is the main scale to measure mineral hardness. Finger nail is 2.5, copper coin is 3.5, glass is 5.5 and steel is 6.5. Hardness scale is Talc is 1, Gypsum is 2, Calcite is 3, Fluorite is 4, Apatite is 5, Orthoclase Feldspar is 6, Quartz is 7, Topaz is 8, Corundum is 9 and Diamond is 10.

Odor
Not always recommended. Does the mineral have an odor of oil, sulfur or something else or is there no odour?

Electric resistance

Every mineral has a different electrical resistance which is done by passing an electric current through the mineral which is received by a receiver.

Relief
Shape and structure of mineral.

Fracture
Type of fracture and fracture pattern.

Shape
Mineral shape or crystal system (cubic, tetragonal, hexagonal, trigonal, orthorhombic, monoclinic or triclinic)

Birefringence
Colour of minerals in crossed polarized light (XPL), colour strength.

Twinning 
Crystal twinning present and type.

Extinction angle 
Degrees which mineral turns black in XPL in microscope.

Zoning
Mineral zoning present.

Mineral texture
Porphyritic (large xenocryst surrounded by fine crystals), Melange (mix of minerals), Poikilitic (one mineral grown around another),Polymorph (same composition but different shape), Hetrogenous (many types of minerals), Homogeneous (one mineral type).

Re-activity 
Is the mineral reactive or nonreactive? If it is reactive it usually has calcium carbonate composition.

Associated rock type 
What rock type is the mineral usually associated.

Degree of metamorphism and alteration 
Mineral shape, properties or form been altered.

Lattice structure and geochemistry- Signature chemical elements and bonds of the mineral. For example, is the mineral hydrous like mica or non hydrous like Jadeite.

See also
 List of minerals

References

Economic Geology principles and practice, Walter L Pohl

External links
 Mineral Identification Key by Alan Plante,  Donald Peck and David Von Bargen, Mineralogical Society of America.

Crystallography
Mineralogy